Bern Nix (September 21, 1947 – May 31, 2017) was an American jazz guitarist. He recorded and performed with Ornette Coleman from 1975 to 1987, notably with guitarist Charlie Ellerbee in Coleman's Prime Time group on their key recordings, including Dancing in Your Head and In All Languages in 1987. Nix was voted among the top ten jazz guitarists poll by Down Beat magazine.

Career
A native of Toledo, Ohio, Nix taught guitar upon his arrival to New York City. He was a graduate of the Berklee College of Music. Nix led the Bern Nix trio from 1985 until his death in 2017 in New York City. In 1993, the band released the album Alarms and Excursions. The album made many critics' top ten lists. Nix released the solo album Low Barometer (Tompkins Square) in September 2006. His composition "Les is More" appears on Art and Money, an album released by 1687, Inc. in 2006. In 2013, the Bern Nix Quartet released Negative Capability.

Nix's song "The Fire Within" was on the soundtrack of the film Tangerine directed by Sean Baker. The film premiered at the Sundance Film Festival in 2015.

His quartet included Francois Grillot, Reggie Sylvester, and Matt Lavelle and performed over 50 concerts, mostly in New York City.

Nix performed with James Chance and the Contortions and appeared on their album Live in New York (1981). He also worked with Jayne Cortez, John Zorn, Marc Ribot, Elliott Sharp, Jemeel Moondoc, Ronald Shannon Jackson, Kip Hanrahan, and Lenore Von Stein.

Discography

As leader
 Alarms and Excursions (New World/Counter Currents, 1993)
 Low Barometer (Tompkins Square, 2006)
 Negative Capability (56 Kitchen, 2013)
 Tangerine (Milan, 2015)

As sideman
With Ornette Coleman
 Dancing in Your Head (Horizon, 1977)
 Body Meta (Artists House, 1978)
 Of Human Feelings (Antilles, 1982)
 Opening the Caravan of Dreams (Caravan of Dreams, 1985)
 In All Languages (Caravan of Dreams, 1987)
 Virgin Beauty (Portrait, 1988)
 Prime Time Live (Repertoire, 1990)

With Jayne Cortez
 Unsubmissive Blues (Bola Press, 1980)
 There It Is (Bola Press, 1982)
 Maintain Control (Bola Press, 1986)
 Everywhere Drums (Bola Press, 1990)
 Poetry & Music (Tradition & Moderne, 1994)
 Cheerful & Optimistic (Bola Press, 1994)
 Taking the Blues Back Home (Harmolodic/Verve, 1996)
 Borders of Disorderly Time (Bola Press, 2003)

With Jemeel Moondoc
 Nostalgia in Times Square (Soul Note, 1986)
 Spirit House (Eremite, 2000)
 Live at the Vision Festival (Ayler, 2003)

With Others
 James Chance and the Contortions, Live in New York (ROIR, 1981)
 Ronald Shannon Jackson, Eye on You (About Time, 1980)
 Frank Lowe, Lowe-Down & Blue (CIMP, 2002)
 Hotel X, "Uncommon Ground", featuring Bern Nix and Greg Ginn (SST Records 2003)

References

External links

1950 births
2017 deaths
20th-century American guitarists
20th-century American male musicians
American jazz guitarists
American male guitarists
American male jazz musicians
Avant-garde jazz musicians
Berklee College of Music alumni
Guitarists from New York City
Guitarists from Ohio
Jazz musicians from New York (state)
Jazz musicians from Ohio
Musicians from Toledo, Ohio
Prime Time (band) members